The Bay of Islands by-election of 1929 was a by-election held on 10 April 1929 during the 22nd New Zealand Parliament in the Northland electorate of Bay of Islands. The by-election came about because Harold Rushworth's win in the general election of the previous year was declared void. The seat was won again by Harold Rushworth of the Country Party.

General election
Harold Rushworth was originally declared the winner of the general election.

Cause of by-election
Supporters of Allen Bell filed a petition to the electoral court complaining of voting irregularities. Bell, however, claimed that he would take no part in any attempts to upset the election, leaving it up to his supporters. This petition was ultimately successful and it was announced by the court that a by-election should take place for the seat.

Selection process
Both Rushworth and Bell decided to run again for the seat.

The Labour Party refused to put up a candidate, believing that the two candidates who had tied with each other should compete in the by-election.

Result
Rushworth won the by-election.

This by-election clearly created much interest as the turnout was higher here than it was at the general election. Rushworth's improved showing can be put down to the fact that he got most of the votes that were previously cast for Hornblow.

References

Bay of Islands 1929
1929 elections in New Zealand
April 1929 events
Politics of the Northland Region